Sir Jonathan Guy Jones  (born 21 May 1962) is a British lawyer, appointed in March 2014 and serving until his resignation on 8 September 2020 as HM Procurator General, Treasury Solicitor and Head of the Government Legal Service, and so the Permanent Secretary of the Government Legal Department (until April 2015, named the Treasury Solicitor's Department).

Early life and education
Jones attended Llandovery College in Carmarthenshire before attending St Chad's College at Durham University where he read a BA in law, graduating in 1984 with a 2:2.

Career
He then was called to the Bar in 1985 and served as a legal advisor to the Motor Agents Association for three years before joining the government in the Office of Fair Trading in 1989. In 1993 Jones transferred to the Treasury Solicitor's Department, briefly into the division working with the Department for Transport, then as Legal Secretariat to the Law Officers from 1994 until 1998. In 1998 Jones became deputy legal advisor to HM Treasury.

In 2002, Jones was promoted to be a director, initially serving as the Legal Director of the Department for Education and Skills, and two years later promoted again to be the Director-General of the Attorney General's Office. In 2009 Jones became the Deputy Treasury Solicitor, and after three years moved to the Home Office as their Director-General for Legal Affairs from 2012 until 2014.

On 1 March 2014, Jones was appointed the Treasury Solicitor, replacing Sir Paul Jenkins on his retirement. In April 2015, the Treasury Solicitor's Department was renamed to be the Government Legal Department, and with it, parts of Jones's job title. As of 2015, Jones was paid a salary of between £160,000 and £164,999, making him one of the 328 most highly paid people in the British public sector at that time.

In January 2019, Queen Elizabeth II approved Jones's appointment as one of six new Honorary Queen's Counsel.

Jones was appointed Knight Commander of the Order of the Bath (KCB) in the 2020 New Year Honours for public service.

Shortly before 8 September 2020 Jones resigned in protest against the government's plans to breach the special Brexit arrangements for Northern Ireland, through the UK Internal Market Bill, in contravention of international law. A spokesman for the Attorney General's Office confirmed the resignation but refused to comment.

After observing a 3-month pause in accordance with advice from the Advisory Committee on Business Appointments, Jones took up a position as a senior consultant with the international law firm Linklaters from 15 March 2021.

Jones is also an Honorary Professor at Durham Law School.

References

External links 
 Official blog post by Jones on the importance of diversity in the Civil Service

Living people
1962 births
Treasury Solicitors
Alumni of St Chad's College, Durham
People educated at Llandovery College
Civil servants in the Department for Education and Skills
Civil servants in HM Treasury
Civil servants in the Ministry of Transport (United Kingdom)
Civil servants in the Home Office
Civil servants in the Attorney General's Office (United Kingdom)
Knights Commander of the Order of the Bath